Coleophora medelichensis is a moth of the family Coleophoridae. It is found from the Czech Republic to the Iberian Peninsula, Italy and Crete and from France to Romania.

Larvae can be found from August to June in two overlapping generations.

References

medelichensis
Moths of Europe
Moths described in 1908